Peter Zelenský (born 27 November 1958) is a former Slovak football player and manager.

He played for Spartak Trnava and Bohemians Prague.

International career
Zelenský made 15 appearances for the full Czechoslovakia national football team.

References

External links
 

1958 births
Living people
Czechoslovak footballers
Slovak footballers
Czechoslovakia international footballers
FC Spartak Trnava players
FK Dukla Banská Bystrica players
Bohemians 1905 players
K.A.A. Gent players
Expatriate footballers in Belgium
FC Chur 97 players
Expatriate footballers in Switzerland
Sportspeople from Trnava
Slovak football managers
Slovak Super Liga managers
FK Dubnica managers
FC Spartak Trnava managers
Czechoslovak expatriate footballers
Czechoslovak expatriate sportspeople in Belgium
Czechoslovak expatriate sportspeople in Switzerland
Association football midfielders